The Shoemaker and the Elves is a 1935 Color Rhapsodies short directed by Arthur Davis. It concerns a poor shoemaker who gives a little boy shelter from a storm.

Plot summary
A homeless waif, staggering through a roaring snow storm, wanders into a small town and no one except a poor shoemaker will give the little boy shelter from the storm. That night, the elves come in with their equipment and material, and make a new supply of shoes for the old man. In the morning, seeing what has happened, the old man tells the boy he has brought him luck, and can stay with him as his adopted son.

References

1935 animated films
American animated short films
1930s animated short films
1930s American animated films
Fictional elves
Films about elves
Fiction about shoemakers
Columbia Pictures short films
1935 short films
Screen Gems short films
Columbia Pictures animated short films
Color Rhapsody